Collins may refer to:

People

Surname

Given name

 Collins O. Bright (1917–?), Sierra Leonean diplomat
 Collins Chabane (1960–2015), South African Minister of Public Service and Administration
 Collins Cheboi (born 1987), Kenyan middle-distance runner
 Collins Denny (1854–1943), American Bishop of the Methodist Episcopal Church, South
 Collins Denny Jr. (1899–1964), American pro-segregationist lawyer.
 Collins Hagler (born 1935), Canadian football player
 Collins Injera (born 1986), Kenyan rugby player
 Collins H. Johnston (1859–1936), American football player, medical doctor, surgeon, and civic leader
 Collins John (born 1985), Liberia-born Dutch footballer
 Collins Mbesuma (born 1984), Zambian footballer nicknamed The Hurricane or Ntofontofo
 Collins Mensah (born 1961), Ghanaian sprinter
 Collins Nweke (born 1965), Belgian politician of the Green Party
 Collins Obuya (born 1981), Kenyan cricketer

Companies
 Collins Aerospace, avionics manufacturer (successor to Rockwell Collins)
 Rockwell Collins, defunct avionics manufacturer
 Collins Radio Company, manufacturer of shortwave radio and broadcast equipment, later acquired by North American Rockwell
 Collins Booksellers, an Australian book store chain founded in 1922 in Melbourne
 Collins Classics, former record company
 Collins Line, common nickname for the New York and Liverpool United States Mail Steamship Company, an American transatlantic steamship line in the 1800s
 Collins Industries, bus builder
 HarperCollins, publisher
 William Collins, Sons, defunct publisher (merged into HarperCollins)

Places

United States
 Collins, Arkansas, a census-designated place
 Collins, California, now incorporated into American Canyon
 Collins, Georgia, a city
 Collins, Indiana, an unincorporated community
 Collins, Iowa, a city
 Collins, Mississippi, a city
 Collins, Missouri, a village
 Collins, New York, a town
 Collins, Ohio, a census-designated place
 Collins, Wisconsin, a census-designated place
 Collins Archeological District, an archaeological site in Illinois
 Collins Fork, a stream in Kentucky

Antarctica
 Collins Bay, on the Antarctic Peninsula
 Collins Glacier, Antarctica
 Collins Base, a research station on the glacier
 Collins Harbour, in the South Shetland Islands
 Collins Peak, Victoria Land
 Collins Point, in the South Shetland Islands

Other places
 Collins Reef or Johnson North Reef, in the Spratly Islands, South China Sea

Other uses
 Camp Collins, a 19th-century Army outpost in Colorado
 Collins (crater), a lunar crater
 Collins Bird Guide, a 1999 field guide to the birds of the Western Palearctic
 Collins Bridge, a bridge that crossed Biscayne Bay, Florida
 Collins Correctional Facility, a medium security prison in Collins, New York
 Collins English Dictionary, a printed and online dictionary of English
 Collins Observatory, an astronomical observatory in Corning, New York
 Collins glass, in which the Tom Collins cocktail is traditionally served
 Collins Place, a hotel and office complex in Melbourne, Australia
 Collins-class submarine, a class of diesel-electric submarine operated by the Royal Australian Navy
 Tom Collins, a gin cocktail
 R v Collins (1987), a Supreme Court of Canada case on exclusion of evidence
 R v Collins, an English case on trespassing

See also
 Collin (disambiguation)
 Collings (disambiguation)
 Collins Township (disambiguation)
 Collinstown (disambiguation)
 Justice Collins (disambiguation)